Franz Eha (7 February 1907 – August 1974) was a Swiss long-distance runner. He competed in the marathon at the 1936 Summer Olympics.

References

External links
 

1907 births
1974 deaths
Athletes (track and field) at the 1936 Summer Olympics
Swiss male long-distance runners
Swiss male marathon runners
Olympic athletes of Switzerland
Sportspeople from Basel-Stadt
20th-century Swiss people